Marcel Ourdouillié (18 December 1913 – 18 July 1962) was a French footballer. He played with USL Dunkerque and RC Lens, as well as the France national team.

References

External links
 Profile at FFF

1913 births
1962 deaths
French footballers
France international footballers
RC Lens players
Ligue 1 players
USL Dunkerque players
Association football midfielders